Theodore Peter Lewin (May 6, 1935 – July 28, 2021) simply known as Ted Lewin, was an American illustrator and writer of children's books. Lewin and his wife Betsy Lewin drew on their travels to exotic places such as the Amazon River, Botswana, Egypt, Lapland, the Sahara Desert, and India when collaborating on their many books. Lewin illustrated over 100 books for children and young adults over the course of 20 years.

Early life

Ted Lewin was born in Buffalo, New York on May 6, 1935. He has a sister and two brothers, Donn and Mark, both of them professional wrestlers. The Lewin household had a number of exotic pets, such as an iguana, a rhesus monkey, a chimpanzee, and a lion. Lewin grew up with the hobby of sketching his family pets. He also copied works of many illustrators and painters that interested him. While attending Lafayette High School (LHS), Lewin refined his talent for art. He graduated from LHS in 1952, and in 1956 earned a BFA degree from Pratt Institute of Art in Brooklyn, where he met his wife, Betsy Reilly. He and his wife resided in Brooklyn, New York.

In order to finance his education at Pratt, Lewin took on a part-time career as a teenage professional wrestler alongside his brothers. His wrestling career lasted for 26 years, and it inspired him to record his experience by writing I Was a Teenaged Professional Wrestler. He wrestled mainly in the World Wide Wrestling Federation from 1963 to 1968.

In 1994, Lewin's book Peppe the Lamplighter received a Caldecott Honor.

In 2006, One Green Apple, illustrated by Lewin and written by Eve Bunting, won the inaugural Arab American Book Award for books written for Children/Young Adults. One Green Apple tells the story of a young girl who has just immigrated to America from an Arab country and her discovery that her differences are what makes her special.

Exhibits
Some exhibits featuring Ted's work:
"Ted and Betsy Lewin's World of Picture Books", Brooklyn Public Library, New York, March 4–30, 2004
"Adventures With Ted and Betsy", Society of Illustrators main floor gallery, June 1 through June 11, 2005
"Travels with Ted and Betsy Lewin", Children's Museum of Manhattan, New York
"Around the World with Ted and Betsy Lewin", Pratt Institute Libraries, October 30 - December 2, 2008

Awards 

 1994: National Jewish Book Award in the Children's Picture Book category for illustrating The Always Prayer Shawl

Championships and accomplishments 
 Cauliflower Alley Club
 Art Abrams Lifetime Achievement Award (2001)

See also

 List of Jewish professional wrestlers

References

External links
 
Lewin at HouseofDeception.com – representative paintings and drawings
 

1935 births
2021 deaths
American children's book illustrators
American children's writers
Pratt Institute alumni
Writers from Buffalo, New York
Jewish American sportspeople
Jewish American writers
Jewish professional wrestlers
Lafayette High School (Buffalo, New York) alumni
21st-century American Jews